The Episcopal Conference of the Indian Ocean (French: Conférence Épiscopale de l'Océan Indien, CEDOI) is an agency of the Catholic Church which includes following Indian Ocean archipelagoes: Comoros, Mauritius, Réunion, Mayotte and Seychelles.

History

Since 1974, the bishops of the Indian Ocean islands would gather each year in an informal meeting. In 1976 the Holy See recognized this assembly with the name of Pastoral Zone of the South West Indian Ocean islands. In 1985 the assembly obtained from Rome the status of a Bishops' Conference with the official name of Conférence Épiscopale de l'Océan Indien. The islands that make up the C.E.D.O.I. have a Catholic population estimated at around one million. Its seat is the town of Port Victoria in Seychelles.
The Episcopal Conference is a member of the Symposium of Episcopal Conferences of Africa and Madagascar.

Members of C.E.D.O.I.

Roman Catholic Diocese of Port Victoria or Seychelles
Diocese of Port-Louis, Mauritius
Vicariate Apostolic of Rodrigues, Mauritius
Diocese of Saint-Denis-de-La Réunion, Réunion
Vicariate Apostolic of the Comoros, Comoros and Mayotte

Presidents

List of presidents of the Episcopal Conference:

1986-1989: Jean Margéot, Cardinal, bishop of Port-Louis

1989-1996: Gilbert Guillaume Jean-Marie Aubry, Bishop of Saint-Denis-de-La Réunion

1996-2002: Maurice Piat, Bishop of Port-Louis

2002-2006: Gilbert Guillaume Jean-Marie Aubry, Bishop of Saint-Denis-de-La Réunion

2006-...: Denis Wiehe, Bishop of Port Victoria

References

External links
 http://www.dioceseportlouis.org/index.php?Itemid=49&id=31&option=com_content&task=view
 http://www.gcatholic.org/dioceses/conference/070.htm

Indian Ocean
+